Steve Hillard is a private equity entrepreneur, attorney, author, and television producer.

Biography 
In 1997, Hillard founded Council Tree Communications, a private equity fund, that assisted the first significant Native American investment in a television network and investments in telecommunications providers

In 2011, Hillard's first book, Mirkwood: A Novel About JRR Tolkien, was involved in an intellectual property controversy. The dispute was settled in May 2011. The settlement terms included the disclaimer, "This is a work of fiction which is neither endorsed nor connected with The JRR Tolkien Estate or its publisher."

List of works
 Mirkwood:  A Novel About JRR Tolkien  (2010-01-18)
 KNOLL: The Last JFK Conspiracist, Select Books,  (2017)
 Farway Canyon with Dennis Nowlan, Select Books, ISBN pending.

References

21st-century American novelists
American fantasy writers
American male novelists
Living people
21st-century American male writers
Year of birth missing (living people)